Sandgate railway station was a railway station on the Sandgate Branch line serving the town of Sandgate in Kent. The station was positioned just after the railway crossed Hospital Hill and had two platforms and a brick built station building.

History
The station was planned as part of the South Eastern Railway's attempt to connect the military base at Shorncliffe with the railway network. A secondary reason was to develop the village of Seabrook as a coastal holiday resort.

It was ceremonially opened on 9 October 1874, and opened fully the next day. By 1910, the station was being served by 15 trains a day from Sandling, with the journey taking around 8 minutes.

Being inland of the town it served, the station was never popular and with increased bus traffic cutting the already small passenger numbers, it was closed on April Fool's Day 1931. The station building was demolished a few months after closure and a bus depot was built on the site which operated until 6 September 1980. The station area has since been completely redeveloped with housing.

References
Citations

Sources

External links
 Station site on 1947 OS Map

Disused railway stations in Kent
Railway stations in Great Britain opened in 1874
Railway stations in Great Britain closed in 1931
Former South Eastern Railway (UK) stations